Dysmicohermes is a genus of fishflies in the family Corydalidae. There are at least two described species in Dysmicohermes.

Species
These two species belong to the genus Dysmicohermes:
 Dysmicohermes disjunctus (Walker, 1866)
 Dysmicohermes ingens Chandler, 1954

References

Further reading

 

Corydalidae
Articles created by Qbugbot